On Cinema (also On Cinema at the Cinema for the video series) is a comedic film review web series starring Tim Heidecker and perpetual guest host Gregg Turkington as a pair of hapless movie reviewers (using their own names). 

The show aired as a podcast from 2011 to 2012 (with 3 additional episodes taking place during the production of the video series in December 2012 and 2013), before being picked up as a professionally produced web video series by Thing X in 2012–13 for its first two seasons, and Adult Swim starting in its third season in 2013. It currently has at least 10 seasons of content, including a special season titled "The Trial." A live Oscar special is also done every year, streamed via YouTube until 2018, whence it was then streamed on Adult Swim.com A total of 172 episodes of content have been released as of February 1, 2018.

On Cinema also has a spin-off series titled Decker, which as of 2018 has aired six seasons combined with three on the web and television, respectively, via Adult Swim.com and Adult Swim.

Series overview

Episodes

Podcast
Note: There was no rating system for the podcast episodes, as that was developed for the video series.

{| class="wikitable"
|-
! Episode !! Air Date!! Title !! Summary
|-
| 101 || 20 September 2011 || Ghostbusters || Tim and Gregg discuss the 20th Anniversary of Ghostbusters starring Bill Murray Dan Aykroyd and Harold Ramis. Directed by Ivan Reitman.
|-
| 102 || 11 October 2011 || The Shining || Tim is joined by his guest @greggturkington to discuss The Shining.
|-
| 103 || 18 October 2011 || Run Lola Run (Live from Octoberfest) || Tim is LIVE FROM OCTOBERFEST to discuss German Cinema and the Film Run Lola Run with his guest Gregg Turkington.
|-
| 104 || 24 October 2011 || Carlito's Way || Tim is joined by guest Gregg Turktington to discuss Carlito's Way starring Al Pacino and Sean Penn.
|-
| 105 || 1 November 2011 || The China Syndrome || Tim and Gregg discuss The China Syndrome not starring Mel Gibson and Danny Glover.
|-
| 106 || 8 November 2011 || Lethal Weapon Trilogy || Tim and Gregg discuss Lethal Weapon starring Mel Gibson and Danny Glover.
|-
| Special || 10 November 2011 || New Movie Bonus Episode!: J. Edgar || Tim and Gregg dicusss A NEW MOVIE in theaters: J. Edgar about Hoover from FBI.
|-
| 107 || 16 November 2011 || The Graduate || Tim and Gregg discuss the film from the Sixties called The Graduate.
|-
| 108 || 21 November 2011 || Star Trek II: The Wrath of Khan || Tim and Gregg discuss Star Trek II.
|-
| 109 || 28 November 2011 || Jewel of the Nile || Tim and Gregg discuss Jewel of the Nile.
|-
| Special || 1 December 2011 || On Cinema Commercial || Our First Commercial For On Cinema Podcast. Written and directed by Tim Heidecker.
|-
| 110 || 6 December 2011 || Escape from Alcatraz (Live from San Francisco) || Tim and Gregg discuss Escape from Alcatraz (live, from San Francisco).
|-
| Special || 13 December 2011 || Holiday Movie Special || ‘Tis the Season! Tim and his special guest Gregg Turkington discuss their favorite Holiday Films. (Miracle on 34th Street and It's a Wonderful Life)
|-
| 111 || 20 December 2011 || Tinker Tailor Soldier Spy || Tim and Gregg discuss Tinker Tailor Soldier Spy.
|-
| 112 || 27 December 2011 || Carlito's Way (encore presentation) || (re-release) Tim and Gregg are gone for New Year's Eve, so enjoy this classic episode of On Cinema.
|-
| 113 || 3 January 2012 || Gone with the Wind || Tim and Gregg discuss Gone with the Wind
|-
| 114 || 10 January 2012 || Misery || Tim and Gregg discuss Misery.
|-
| 115 || 17 January 2012 || Driving Miss Daisy || Tim and Gregg discuss Driving Miss Daisy.
|-
| 116 || 23 January 2012 || 12 Angry Men || Tim and Gregg discuss 12 Angry Men.
|-
| 117 || 31 January 2012 || Easy Rider || Tim and Gregg discuss Easy Rider
|-
| 118 || 7 February 2012 || Bad News Bears || Tim and Gregg discuss Bad News Bears
|-
| 119 || 14 February 2012 || For Your Eyes Only || Tim and Gregg discuss For Your Eyes Only.
|-
| 120 || 21 February 2012 || Saving Private Ryan || Tim and Gregg discuss Saving Private Ryan.
|-
| 121 || 21 February 2012 || Kramer versus Kramer || Tim and Gregg discuss Kramer versus Kramer.
|-
| 122 || 5 March 2012 || Trinity and Beyond || Tim and Gregg discuss Trinity and Beyond.
|-
| 123 || 12 March 2012 || Atomic Cafe and Radio Bikini || Tim and Gregg discuss Atomic Cafe and Radio Bikini.
|-
| 124 || 19 March 2012 || Legal Eagles || Tim and Gregg discuss Legal Eagles.
|-
| 125 || 26 March 2012 || Scenes from a Mall || Tim and Gregg discuss Scenes from a Mall.
|-
| 126 || 2 April 2012 || Grease || Tim and Gregg discuss Grease.
|-
| 127 || 9 April 2012 || One Flew Over the Cuckoo's Nest || Tim and Gregg discuss One Flew Over the Cuckoo's Nest.
|-
| 128 || 16 April 2012 || The Three Stooges || Tim and Gregg discuss The Three Stooges.
|-
| Special || 18 April 2012 || Special Thanks || Thanks for your support and listenership!
|-
| Special || 20 April 2012 || The Music of The Three Stooges || Tim and Gregg discuss the music of The Three Stooges.
|-
| 129 || 24 April 2012 || JFK || Tim and Gregg discuss JFK.
|-
| 130 || 27 April 2012 || An Officer and A Gentleman || Tim Heidecker discusses the film An Officer and A Gentleman with his special guest Gregg Turkington.
|-
| 131 || 4 May 2012 || The Addams Family || Tim Heidecker discusses the film The Addams Family with his special guest Gregg Turkington.
|-
| 132 || 11 May 2012|| Being There || Tim Heidecker discusses the film Being There with his special guest Gregg Turkington.
|-
| 133 || 18 May 2012 || Hunt for Red October || Tim Heidecker discusses the film Hunt for Red October with his special guest Gregg Turkington.
|-
| 134 || 24 May 2012 || Krippendorf's Tribe || Tim and Gregg discuss Krippendorf's Tribe starring Richard Dreyfuss and Jenna Elfman.
|-
| 135 || 4 June 2012 || 300 || Tim and Gregg discuss 300 with special guest Jordan Hoffman.
|-
| 136 || 8 June 2012 || American Graffiti (Live from Modesto, CA!) || TIm and Gregg are LIVE in Modesto CA! Birthplace of George Lucas and setting for American Graffiti!!!! 
|-
| Special || 11 June 2012 || On Cinema Follow-up: George Lucas || Tim welcomes a special surprise guest to this studio to settle the debate as to where American Graffiti was filmed.
|-
| 137 || 17 June 2012 || All That Jazz (Live from San Francisco) || Tim and Gregg are LIVE from Club Snazz in San Francisco, talking about Jazz and ALL That Jazz.
|-
| Special || 18 June 2012 || Stump the Buff Film Trivia Contest w/Gregg Turkington || N/A
|-
| 138 || 21 June 2012 || Ice Age || Tim and Gregg discuss the snimated classic "Ice Age".
|-
| Special || 2 July 2012 || Fan Favorites || Tim takes calls from listeners and discusses their favorite films. Special guest, Gregg Turkington. (Blade Runner, King of New York, Boogie Nights, Harry and the Hendersons, Match Point, Small Soldiers,Chariots of Fire, and The Long Goodbye)
|-
| 139 || 6 July 2012 || The Smurfs || Tim and Gregg record a podcast on a plane! Discussing Smurfs.
|-
| Special || 16 July 2012 || Best of the Early Shows || Tim signs off for the summer and plays some of his favorite shows from the "early period." 
|-
| 140 || 31 August 2012 || Dirty Harry || The On Cinema Family is BACK!! NEW THEME! New Energy! Tim welcomes back frequent host Gregg Turkington to discuss the classic film "Dirty Harry"
|-
| 141 || 10 September 2012 || Love at First Bite || Tim welcomes guest Gregg Turkington to discuss the film parody "Love at First Bite'" starring George Hamilton and Sherman Hemsley.
|-
| 142 || 17 September 2012 || James Bond (guest host Gregg Turkington) || Tim cedes his On Cinema host chair to Gregg Turkington to discuss the films of James Bond. 
|-
| 143 || 24 September 2012 || Pink Panther || Tim welcomes guest Gregg Turkington to discuss the Pink Panther movie. 
|-
| 144 || 1 October 2012 || Runaway Train || Tim welcomes guest Gregg Turkington to discuss the film "Runaway Train".
|-
| 145 || 8 October 2012 || Pretty Woman || Tim welcomes special guest Gregg Turkington to discuss "Pretty Woman" with Richard Gere.
|-
| 146 || 15 October 2012 || Atlas Shrugged || Tim discusses the film "Atlas Shrugged" with special guest Gregg Turkington. 
|-
| Special || 22 October 2012 || Special Announcement || TIm has a special announcement. 
|-
| Special || 29 October 2012 || Extra Special Halloween Edition || A special Halloween episode of On Cinema with special guest, horror film expert Gregg Turkington. (Dead Heat)
|-
| Special || 2 November 2012 || On Cinema at the Cinema Announcement || On Cinema at the Cinema premieres on thingx.com - be the first to watch the new reviews! This podcast is going on hiatus during the run of On Cinema At the Cinema! 
|-
| Special || 24 December 2012 || 2nd Annual Holiday Special || Tim and Gregg are back just in time for Christmas! Hear their picks for some great holiday film recomnendations.
|-
| Special || 15 April 2013 || Back Again || Tim and Gregg talk about a movie called "Back Again"=."
|-
| 147 || 22 April 2013 || Courage Under Fire (guest host Gregg Turkington) || Fill in host Gregg Turkington discusses the film Courage Under Fire|-
|}

Season 1 (2012-2013)

Film Ratings

Season 2 (2013)

Film Ratings

Season 3 (2013)

Film Ratings

Season 4 (2014)

Film Ratings

Season 5 (2014)

Film Ratings

Season 6 (2015)

Film Ratings

Season 7 (2015)

Film Ratings

Season 8 (2016)

Film Ratings

Season 9 (2017)

Film Ratings

The Trial (2017)
This mini-series, specially called "The Trial" introduced a new dynamic for the series, instead focusing on the fictional murder trial against Tim Heidecker that was set up mid-season nine. The trial was staged similar to real-life trials and took place over two weeks and lasted approximately five hours in total.

Season X (2018)
Season 10, premiered in January 2018 with an Oscar Special Telethon. The season is being called "Season X."

Film Ratings

Season 11 (2019)
Season 11, premiered in January 2019 with an Oscar Special Telethon fundraiser to crowdfund the new annual Oscar Special.

Film Ratings

Season 12 (2019-2022)
Season 12, premiered in December 2019 with an Oscar Special Telethon fundraiser to crowdfund the new annual Oscar Special. The Seventh Annual On Cinema Oscar Special was the last On Cinema at the Cinema content to air on Adult Swim's website, as the series would then move to HEI Network, an independent subscription service, in April 2021. The Eighth Annual On Cinema Oscar Special, hosted by Tim, streamed live on HEI Network while The Ninth Annual Our Cinema Oscar Special, hosted by Gregg, streamed live on YouTube (though replays would only be available on HEI Network).

Film Ratings

Season 13 (2022-2023)

Film Ratings

Season 14 (2023-)

See also
List of Decker episodes, episodes to the 2014 web and TV spin-off of On Cinema''.

References

External links

Lists of American comedy television series episodes